Seyah Dowlan or Siah Dowlan or Seyah Dulan may refer to:
 Seyah Dowlan, Ahar
 Siah Dowlan, Sarab